The following is a timeline of the history of Fukuoka City, Japan.

Prior to 20th century

 1601 - Fukuoka Castle construction begins.
 1868 -  The temple of Yeiyas was destroyed by fire.
 1877 -  (newspaper) begins publication.
 1880 - Fukuoka Nichinichi Shimbun (newspaper) in publication.
 1881 - Genyōsha political group founded.
 1885 - Fukuoka Prefectural Shuyukan (school) active.
 1887 - Population: 50,442.
 1889 - Hakata becomes part of Fukuoka city.
 1899 - Foreign commerce begins.

20th century

 1901 - Population: about 72,000.
 1909 - Population: 82,106.
 1910 - Kyushu Imperial University established.
 1917 - Fukuoka Prefectural Fukuoka High School established.
 1928 - Heiwadai Stadium opens.
 1929 - Ōhori Park opens.
 1940 - Population: 306,763.
 1941 - Mitsubishi Trust branch opens.
 1942 - Kanmon Tunnel opened; first direct railway link between Honshu and Kyushu
 1943 - Military Mushiroda Airfield built.
 1945
 City firebombed on 19 June during World War II.
 US military occupation of Itazuke Air Base begins.
 Population: 252,282.
 1947
 Fukuoka Marathon begins.
 Population: 328,548.
 1949 - Fukuoka Stock Exchange established.
 1950 - Population: 392,649.
 1953 - Fukuoka Municipal Zoo and Botanical Garden founded.
 1956 - Fukuoka Daiichi High School established.
 1957 - Grand Sumo tournament begins.
 1960 - Population: 749,800.
 1963 - Fukuoka Institute of Technology active.
 1972
 Fukuoka designated a government ordinance city.
 US military occupation of Itazuke Air Base ends.
 Hirokawa Bosai Dam is completed
 1975
 March: Sanyō Shinkansen (hi-speed train) begins operating.
 Population: 1,000,000.
 1979 - Fukuoka Art Museum established.
 1981
 Kūkō Line (Fukuoka City Subway) begins operating.
  opens.
 1982
 Subway Hakozaki Line begins operating.
  established.
 1983 - Subway Gion Station opens.
 1989
 Fukuoka Tower built.
 Fukuoka Hawks baseball team active.
 1990
 Fukuoka City Museum established.
 Population: 1,221,600.
 1993 - Fukuoka Dome (stadium) opens.
 1995 - Hakatanomori Football Stadium opens.
 1996 - Canal City Hakata (shopping mall) in business.
 1999
  opens.
 Fukuoka Asian Art Triennale exhibit begins.
 2000 - Population: 1,341,489.

21st century

 2001 - Sky Dream Fukuoka (ferris wheel) erected.
 2003 - Fukuoka International Congress Center opens.
 2005
 February: Subway Nanakuma Line begins operating.
 March 20: 2005 Fukuoka earthquake occurs.
 2010
  elected mayor.
 Population: 1,463,743.
 2011 - Hakata Station rebuilt.

See also
 Fukuoka history
 Timeline of Fukuoka (in Japanese)

References

This article incorporates information from the Japanese Wikipedia.

Bibliography

External links

 Items related to Fukuoka, various dates (via Europeana).
 Items related to Fukuoka, various dates (via Digital Public Library of America).

Fukuoka
Fukuoka
Years in Japan
History of Fukuoka Prefecture